Anaxandra (fl. 220s BC) was an ancient Greek female artist and painter from Greece.  She was the daughter and student of Nealkes, a painter of mythological and genre scenes. She painted circa 228 B.C. She is mentioned by Clement of Alexandria, the 2nd century Christian theologian, in a section of his Stromateis (Miscellanies) entitled "Women as Well as Men Capable of Perfection". Clement cites a lost work of the Hellenistic scholar Didymus Chalcenterus (1st century BC) as his source.

Modern uses
Her name was given by the International Astronomical Union in 1994 to a large 20 km diameter crater on Venus to commemorate the artist.  The name was also used by the author Caroline B. Cooney for the principal character in her 2003 novel Goddess of Yesterday, which is set during the Trojan War.

See also
List of craters on Venus

Notes

References
Anaxandra  in the Dictionary of Greek and Roman Biography and Mythology William Smith (1870) at Ancient Library. Accessed September 2007
 Women Artists in All Ages and Countries By Elizabeth Fries Ellet, New York, 1859.  At Google book search.
Painting of Ancient Sikyon at Ancient Greek Cities,  (1997) Ellen Papakyriakou/Anagnostou.  Accessed September 2007
Anaxandra crater Venus Crater database, Lunar and Planetary Institute, 2007
Anaxandra crater Gazetteer of Planetary Nomenclature. Accessed September 2007

3rd-century BC births
3rd-century BC Greek people
Ancient Sicyonians
Ancient Greek women artists
Ancient Greek painters
Greek women painters
Year of death unknown
3rd-century BC Greek women
3rd-century BC painters